John Lance may refer to:
 John Lance (priest)
 John Lance (basketball)